Arıkuyusu is a village in Gülnar district of Mersin Province, Turkey. It is situated in the Taurus Mountains, to the north of Gülnar. The population of the village was 618 as of 2012.

References

Villages in Gülnar District